The 1997 European Road Championships were held in Villach, Austria, in September 1997. Regulated by the European Cycling Union. The event consisted of a road race and time trial for under-23 women and under-23 men.

Events summary

Medal table

References

External links
The European Cycling Union

European Road Championships, 1997
European Road Championships by year
International cycle races hosted by Austria
1997 in Austrian sport
Villach